KD7 may refer to:
 China Railways KD7, a Chinese steam locomotive type
 Type KD7 submarine, an Imperial Japanese Navy submarine type